Gyrospilara is a genus of moths of the family Noctuidae.

Species
 Gyrospilara formosa (Graeser, 1888)

References
Natural History Museum Lepidoptera genus database
Gyrospilara at funet

Xyleninae